Wildcat! BBS is a bulletin board system server application that Mustang Software developed in 1986 for MS-DOS, and later ported to Microsoft Windows.

The product was later expanded to integrate Internet access under the name WINServer (Wildcat! Interactive Net Server). Mustang sold Wildcat! to Santronics Software, Inc. on November 19, 1998. Santronics had been an active third-party developer for the Wildcat! product lines since 1991.

See also
 List of BBS software

References

External links
Santronics Software

Bulletin board system software
DOS software